Lincoln Township is one of eighteen townships in Buena Vista County, Iowa. As of the 2000 census, its population was 183.

Geography
According to the USGS, it contains one cemetery, Lincoln Township.

References

External links
 US-Counties.com
 City-Data.com

Townships in Buena Vista County, Iowa
Townships in Iowa